The Lancia 20-30 HP (Tipo 56), later renamed Lancia Delta, is a passenger car produced by Italian car manufacturer Lancia during 1911. 
The Delta was based on the earlier 20 HP Gamma, with an enlarged engine. 303 Deltas were made in total, before it was replaced by the improved 20-30 HP Epsilon.

The Delta was built with two wheelbases, normal and short. The latter was destined for competition-oriented Corsa models, to be bodied as open two- or three-seaters.

Specifications
The Delta was powered by a  Tipo 56 side valve monobloc inline-four engine with a cast iron block.

The transmission was a 4-speed gearbox with a multi-plate wet clutch.
The chassis was a conventional ladder frame, with solid axles sprung on semi-elliptic front and three-quarter-elliptic rear leaf springs. The brakes were on the transmission and on the rear wheels.

Notes

References

Bibliography

 
 

20-30 HP Delta
Cars introduced in 1911
Brass Era vehicles